Športska dvorana Gospino polje is a multi-purpose indoor sports arena located in Dubrovnik, Croatia.

The arena hosts basketball, including occasional Croatian national team matches and basketball club KK Dubrovnik. It has also hosted international futsal qualifiers.

References

Indoor arenas in Croatia
Sports venues completed in 1981
Buildings and structures in Dubrovnik
Sport in Dubrovnik